The 1951 All-Eastern football team consists of American football players chosen by various selectors as the best players at each position among the Eastern colleges and universities during the 1951 college football season.

Offensive selections

Backs
 Dick Kazmaier, Princeton (AP-1)
 Harry Agganis, Boston University (AP-1)
 Chuck Maloy, Holy Cross (AP-1)
 Burt Talmage (AP-1)

Ends
 Karl Kluckhohn, Colgate (AP-1)
 Tom McCann, Holy Cross (AP-1)

Tackles
 Paul Tetreault, Navy (AP-1)
 Charles Metzer, Cornell (AP-1)

Guards
 Gerald Audette, Columbia (AP-1)
 John Pietro, Brown (AP-1)

Centers
 William Vesprini, Dartmouth (AP-1)

Defensive selections

Defensive ends
 Frank McPhee, Princeton (AP-1)
 Edward Bell, Penn (AP-1)

Defensive tackles
 George Young, Bucknell (AP-1)
 Gerald McGinley, Penn (AP-1)

Defensive guards
 Nick Liotta, Vilanova (AP-1)
 Victor Bihl, Princeton (AP-1)

Defensive center
 David Hickok, Princeton (AP-1)

Defensive backs
 Robert Spears, Yale (AP-1)
 William Whelan, Cornell (AP-1)
 Richard Pivirotto, Princeton (AP-1)
 Frank Hauff, Navy (AP-1)

Key
 AP = Associated Press

See also
 1951 College Football All-America Team

References

All-Eastern
All-Eastern college football teams